Robert G. Klein (born ca. 1948) is a former justice of the Supreme Court of Hawaii from March 31, 1992, to February 4, 2000. He was appointed by governor John Waihee. He left office 8 years into his 10-year term to join a private firm. He is part Hawaiian.

He graduated from Punahou School in 1965. He graduated from Stanford University and the University of Oregon School of Law. In 1972 when he was appointed law clerk for Chief Justice William S. Richardson U.S. President Bill Clinton appointed him to the 9th Circuit Court of Appeals in 1994, but he withdrew his name after failing to be confirmed by the Republican Party controlled U.S. Senate.

Katherine Leonard clerked for him.

References

Year of birth missing (living people)
Living people
Stanford University alumni
University of Oregon School of Law alumni
Justices of the Hawaii Supreme Court